West Las Vegas Public Schools is a school district based in Las Vegas, New Mexico, United States.

The district covers a  area in southern San Miguel County.

Within the city of Las Vegas, the district serves areas located west of the Gallinas River. Other communities in the district include Pueblo, Ribera, San Jose, Sena, Tecolote, and Villanueva.

History

In 1972 the West Las Vegas district offered to have school bus transportation from Anton Chico, a community in the Santa Rosa Consolidated Schools which had its middle school closed and which had some resentment in turn against the Santa Rosa district, to the West Las Vegas schools. The West Las Vegas district asked the State of New Mexico to pay for the transportation costs, but in 1973 the New Mexico State Board of Education denied the request to pay.

Schools

High school
Grades 9-12
West Las Vegas High School

Middle schools
Grades 6-8
Valley Middle School
West Las Vegas Middle School

Elementary schools
Grades 2-5 
Don Cecilio Martinez Elementary School
Tony Serna, Jr. Elementary School
Union Street Elementary School
Grades K-5 
Valley Elementary School
Grades K-1 
Luis E. Armijo Elementary School

Other Campuses
West Las Vegas Family Partnership 
High School Site (Grades 7-12)
Rio Gallinas School (Grades 1-8)

Enrollment
2007-2008 School Year: 1,795 students
2006-2007 School Year: 1,832 students
2005-2006 School Year: 2,001 students
2004-2005 School Year: 1,952 students
2003-2004 School Year: 1,999 students
2002-2003 School Year: 2,056 students
2001-2002 School Year: 2,080 students
2000-2001 School Year: 2,111 students

Demographics
There were a total of 1,795 students enrolled in West Las Vegas Public Schools during the 2007-2008 school year. The gender makeup of the district was 48.30% female and 51.70% male. The racial makeup of the district was 92.53% Hispanic, 5.68% White, 1.06% African American, 0.61% Native American, and 0.11% Asian/Pacific Islander.

See also
List of school districts in New Mexico
Las Vegas City Schools - a district serving areas of Las Vegas located east of the Gallinas River.

References

External links
West Las Vegas Schools – Official site.

Las Vegas, New Mexico
School districts in New Mexico
Education in San Miguel County, New Mexico